Death on a Factory Farm is a 2009 television documentary film concerning the animal rights abuses at the Wiles hog farm, and the subsequent investigation and trial.

Synopsis
Death on a Factory Farm follows the undercover investigation of Wiles Hog Farm by the animal rights group The Humane Farming Association (HFA), and the resulting court case against it. The organization received a tip from an employee at the farm that animals were being abused, including a claim that hogs were being hung by chains and strangled to death as a form of euthanasia. HFA then turned to an undercover investigator using the name "Pete". The investigator wore a hidden camera while he worked undercover as a farmhand at Wiles.

Over the course of six weeks, the investigator secretly filmed numerous incriminating scenes, including piglets being tossed into crates from across a room, impregnated sows held in pens impeded their ability to move, an unhealthy piglet being hit against a wall to euthanize it, and a sick sow being hung by a chain from a forklift until it choked to death. Having obtained this evidence, Pete concluded the investigation and quit the job at the farm.

HFA brought Pete's footage to the Wayne County Sheriff's Department, which then raided the farm. Prosecutors filed ten criminal charges of animal cruelty against the farm's owners, and a farm employee who participated in hanging the sow.

In the subsequent trial, the prosecutors and the defense fought about the legality and morality of these practices, described by the presiding judge as "distasteful and offensive". However, the judge defended these practices as the reality of producing pork for consumption.

References

External links

 
 
 Review from Nytimes.com

2009 television films
2009 films
American documentary television films
2009 documentary films
Documentary films about animal rights
2000s English-language films
2000s American films